Callytron is a genus of beetles in the family Cicindelidae, containing the following species:

 Callytron alleni (W. Horn, 1908)
 Callytron andersoni (Gestro, 1889)
 Callytron doriai (W. Horn, 1897)
 Callytron gyllenhalii (Dejean, 1825)
 Callytron inspeculare (W. Horn, 1904)
 Callytron limosum (Saunders, 1834)
 Callytron malabaricum (Fleutiaux & Maindron, 1903)
 Callytron monalisa (W. Horn, 1927)
 Callytron nivicinctum (Chevrolat, 1845)
 Callytron terminatum (Dejean, 1825)
 Callytron yuasai (Nakane, 1955)

References

Cicindelidae